Plzeň shopping center referendum was held on 12 January 2013. Plzeň citizens refused shopping center Corso to be built near historical center of the city.

Campaign
Opponents of the shopping center called their campaign "Yes for Pilsen." It was started on 19 December 2012. Opponents argumented that the council focuses only on economical aspect of the center and that the center wouldn't fit in the historical part of the city. The company Amadeus Real that invested in the center started their own campaign for the shopping center. The company argumented by new jobs for citizens. The city council started its own informational campaign on 5 December. It was focused on negative impacts to the city if the shopping center is refused.

Supporters of the center included Milan Chovanec while opponents were supported by Jiří Pospíšil.

Results

References

Referendums in the Czech Republic
2013 referendums
2013 elections in the Czech Republic
Elections in Plzeň